Lucas Gridoux (16 April 1896 – 22 April 1952) was a Romanian-born French stage and film actor.

Biography
He was born in 1896 in Herța, at the time in Dorohoi County, Kingdom of Romania. After emigrating to France, Gridoux began his film career in 1931, playing mainly in roles of traitors. In 1935, he was Judas in Julien Duvivier's Golgotha, and then in 1937, Inspector Slimane, a sworn enemy of Jean Gabin in Pépé le Moko, by the same director.

He died in 1952 at the Pitié-Salpêtrière Hospital in Paris, and was buried at the city's Père Lachaise Cemetery.

Selected filmography
 American Love (1931)
 Golgotha (1935)
 Pépé le Moko (1937)
 The Cheat (1937)
 The Citadel of Silence (1937)
 Beethoven's Great Love (1937)
 The Men Without Names (1937)
 Storm Over Asia (1938)
 Rail Pirates (1938)
 The Queen's Necklace (1946)
 The Captain (1946)
 Panic (Panique) (1947)
 Secret Cargo (1947)
 The Scarlet Bazaar (1947)
 Dilemma of Two Angels (1948)
 Oriental Port (1950)
 The Case of Doctor Galloy (1951)

References

Bibliography
 Lanzoni, Rémi Fournier. French Cinema: From its Beginnings to the Present. Continuum, 2004.

External links

1896 births
1952 deaths
French male film actors
Romanian male film actors
People from Chernivtsi Oblast
Romanian emigrants to France
Burials at Père Lachaise Cemetery